Theodore James "Ted" Courant is an American mathematician who has conducted research in the fields of differential geometry and classical mechanics.  In particular, he made seminal contributions to the study of Dirac manifolds, which generalize both symplectic manifolds and Poisson manifolds, and are related to the Dirac theory of constraints in physics.  Some mathematical objects in this field have since been named after him, including the Courant bracket and Courant algebroid.  He received his B.A. degree from Reed College and his Ph.D. from The University of California, Berkeley, where he was a student of Alan Weinstein. Ted Courant is the grandson of Richard Courant .

Courant has more recently turned his attention to education. He is a member of the Educational Advisory Committee at MSRI , teacher of Outstanding Differential Equations, and an instructor at the Berkeley Math Circle .

References

Reed College alumni
University of California, Berkeley alumni
20th-century American mathematicians
Living people
Year of birth missing (living people)
21st-century American mathematicians